Medfra is an unincorporated community located in the Yukon-Koyukuk Census Area in the U.S. state of Alaska.

Geography 

History 
Medfra may have been a small seasonal camp for Alaska Natives before the arrival of Europeans in Alaska. Early in the 20th century, a trading post and boat landing called "Berrys Landing" were established at Medfra. A post office was open from 1922 to 1955.

Demographics

Medfra first reported on the 1930 U.S. Census as an unincorporated village. It did not appear again until 1950. It last appeared on the 1990 census, when it was designated an Alaskan Native Village Statistical Area (ANVSA), but it was uninhabited. It has not appeared on the census since.

References

Unincorporated communities in Alaska
Unincorporated communities in Unorganized Borough, Alaska
Unincorporated communities in Yukon–Koyukuk Census Area, Alaska